The 2010–11 Ekstraklasa season was Lechia Gdańsk's 67th since their creation, and was their 3rd continuous season in the top league of Polish football. On 7 August 2010 the club celebrated its 65th anniversary.

The season covers the period from 1 July 2010 to 30 June 2011.

Players

First team squad

Transfers

Players In

Out

League

League table

Stats

Goalscorers

References

Lechia Gdańsk seasons
Polish football clubs 2010–11 season